United States v. Google may refer to:

 United States v. Google LLC, an ongoing antitrust suit brought by the U.S. Department of Justice in 2020
 United States v. Google Inc., a privacy lawsuit brought by the Federal Trade Commission (FTC) that settled in 2012

Google litigation